The 2021 Cazoo European Championship was the fourteenth edition of the Professional Darts Corporation's European Championship tournament, which saw the top players from the two European tour events compete against each other. The tournament took place from 14 to 17 October 2021 at the Salzburgarena in Salzburg, Austria.

Peter Wright was the defending champion, having won the tournament for the first time with an 11–4 win over James Wade in the 2020 final. However, he became the third consecutive defending champion to be eliminated in the first round after losing 6–3 to Florian Hempel.

Rob Cross won his second European Championship title after defeating Michael van Gerwen 11–8 in a repeat of the 2017 final.

In the quarter-finals, Gerwyn Price's average of 107.56 against van Gerwen became the highest ever losing average at a European Championship.

Prize money
The 2021 European Championship had a total prize fund of £500,000, the same as its previous edition.

The following is the breakdown of the fund:

Qualification
The 2021 tournament continued the new qualification system used in the three previous editions: the top 32 players from the European Tour Order of Merit qualified for the tournament. The Order of Merit is solely based on prize money won in the two European tour events during the season.

As with the previous tournaments, players were drawn in a fixed bracket by their seeded order with the top qualifier playing the 32nd, the second playing the 31st, and so on.

The following players qualified for the tournament:

Draw

References

2021
2021 in darts
2021 in Austrian sport
European Championship